Thara is census town in Banaskantha district, Gujarat, India.

References 

Cities and towns in Banaskantha district